Nepal Chandra Das (23 April 1944 - 23 January 2018) was an Indian politician. He was elected to the Lok Sabha the lower house of Indian Parliament from Karimganj, Assam in 1998 and 1999. He was a member of the Indian National Congress.

References

External links
Profile on Lok Sabha website

1944 births
2018 deaths
Lok Sabha members from Assam
India MPs 1998–1999
India MPs 1999–2004
People from Karimganj district
Indian National Congress politicians
Asom Gana Parishad politicians
People from Mymensingh Division
21st-century Bengalis
20th-century Bengalis
Indian National Congress politicians from Assam